Isodor Harry Checchio (June 8, 1922 – November 23, 2003) was a former Republican member of the Pennsylvania House of Representatives.

References

Republican Party members of the Pennsylvania House of Representatives
1922 births
2003 deaths
20th-century American politicians